Shadows and Lies (also known as In Praise of Shadows and William Vincent) is a 2010 romantic drama film starring James Franco and Julianne Nicholson. Filming took place in New York City, New York. The film had a release at the Tribeca Film Festival in April 2010.

Plot
William Vincent (James Franco) returns to New York after four years in exile to save the girl (Julianne Nicholson) he loves from the same dangerous crime syndicate that brought them together.

Cast
James Franco as William Vincent
Julianne Nicholson as Ann
Josh Lucas as Boss
Martin Donovan as Victor
Emily Tremaine as Cindy

External links
 
 

Films shot in New York (state)
Films shot in New York City
2010 crime drama films
2010 films
American crime drama films
2010s English-language films
2010s American films